Industrialnyi District is an urban district of the city of Dnipro, in southern Ukraine. It is located at the northern portion of the city on the left-bank of Dnieper River along with the city's Amur-Nyzhnodniprovskyi District and Samarskyi districts.

History
In the 18th century the area was inhabited by several villages, including one colony of German settlers called "Josefstad".

Since the 1950s the area has been expanded by industry and housing complexes. In the 1960s this led to the need to make the area a new urban district. The Industrialnyi District was created on 23 May 1969 by splitting away the eastern and northern parts of the Amur-Nyzhnodniprovskyi District that predominantly contain areas of heavy industry.

In 1977 the eastern outskirts of the Industrialnyi District along the Samara River were transferred to the newly formed Samarskyi District. The major factory of the district is the  that is owned by the Ukrainian Interpipe Group.

Neighborhoods
 Nove Klochko
 Livoberezhnyi
 Samarivka

References

External links

  

Urban districts of Dnipro
States and territories established in 1969
1969 establishments in Ukraine